Afsariyeh is a neighborhood in the south-east of Tehran in Iran. In 1977, the state ordered the eviction of squatted shanty towns in Afsariyeh.

References 

Neighbourhoods in Tehran
Squatting in Iran